Pseudonoorda brunneifusalis is a moth in the family Crambidae. It was described by George Hampson in 1917. It is found on New Guinea.

Subspecies
Pseudonoorda brunneifusalis brunneifusalis (Papua New Guinea)
Pseudonoorda brunneifusalis iridescens (Whalley, 1962) (Rennell Island)

References

Moths described in 1917
Odontiinae